Dinedor is a hill, village and civil parish in Herefordshire, England. The hilltop is the site of Dinedor Camp, an Iron Age fort.

The name Dinedor is possibly of Celtic origin meaning hill with a fort.

References

External links
 Dinedor community website

Villages in Herefordshire